Simena was a town on the coast of ancient Lycia, 60 stadia from Aperlae. The Stadiasmus Maris Magni calls the town Somena (Σόμηνα).

Its site is located near Kaleköy, Turkey. Grave inscriptions and coin finds indicate that the town existed in the fourth century BC. Part of the ancient city is now submerged in the sea and remains of the Titus thermal baths lie in the water. A small theatre or bouleuterion on the acropolis within the later fort and carved into the rock can be seen.

References

Ancient Greek archaeological sites in Turkey
Populated places in ancient Lycia
Former populated places in Turkey
Demre District